Jerome Packard is an American linguist specializing in Chinese linguistics and psycholinguistics. He is Professor Emeritus of Chinese, Educational Psychology and Linguistics at the University of Illinois at Urbana-Champaign. His book The Morphology of Chinese (2000) is influential and widely cited in Chinese linguistics. His more recent book A Social View on the Chinese Language (2021) offers a linguistic introduction to the Chinese language for the general reader.

External links
Profile at University of Illinois
Review of The Morphology of Chinese by San Duanmu
Review of The Morphology of Chinese by Richard Sproat
Review of  The Morphology of Chinese by Karen Chung

Linguists from the United States
Living people
Year of birth missing (living people)